Johanna Catharina Antonia "Joke" Bijleveld (born 7 October 1940) is a retired Dutch track and field athlete. She competed in the long jump at the 1960 and 1964 Summer Olympics and finished in seventh and fifteenth place, respectively; at the 1964 Games she also took part in the 100 m event. At the 1962 European Championships she finished fourth in the long jump, one centimeter short of the second-third place.

References

1940 births
Living people
Dutch female long jumpers
Dutch female sprinters
Athletes (track and field) at the 1960 Summer Olympics
Athletes (track and field) at the 1964 Summer Olympics
Olympic athletes of the Netherlands
Sportspeople from The Hague
20th-century Dutch women
20th-century Dutch people